Sharad P. Paul is a New Zealand based skin cancer specialist, social entrepreneur and author. Currently, he is an adjunct Professor at the Auckland University of Technology and senior lecturer at the School of Medicine, University of Queensland, Australia. He is also senior Lecturer in the Faculty of Surgery at the University of Auckland. He has authored both fiction including novels and poetry as well as non-fiction including medical books, journals and articles.

Early life and education
Paul was born in England, and grew up in India. His parents moved to India when he was a child, and he has lived in New Zealand since 1991. He graduated as a Doctor of Medicine from the University of Madras in 1988. He holds a M Phil in Medical Law and Ethics from the University of Glasgow in 2002.

Career
Paul began his academic career as a senior lecturer at University of Auckland in 1996 and joined as a senior lecturer at the School of Medicine, University of Queensland, Australia in 2006. In 2016, Paul joined as adjunct Professor at Auckland University of Technology. In 1996, he founded his own medical practice, the Skin Surgery Clinic, in Auckland.

Paul founded Baci Group which included a skin care company, Baci Lounge, a bookstore and Baci Foundation, a charity.

Paul speaks at medical, literary, arts and ideas conferences such as 2013 THiNK, Auckland Writers Festival, Chatham House, London, JLF London, Dalkey Book Festival and TED conferences, has published numerous articles and academic publications. He is a Fellow of the Royal NZ College of General Practitioners and Skin Cancer College of Australasia, and has served on the National Commission of UNESCO.

Awards and recognition
2018- Kiwi Indian Hall of Fame from the Prime Minister Jacinda Ardern
2016- Distinguished Fellowship of the Royal New Zealand College of General Practitioners
2015- Ko Awatea International Excellence Award for Leading (Health) Improvement on a Global Scale
2012- Finalist - New Zealander of the Year Award
2012- Chair's Award - New Zealand Medical Association's highest award
2008- Time Magazine “Open Heart Surgeon”
2003-Health Innovation Award

Publications

A New Skin Tensiometer Device: Computational Analyses To Understand Biodynamic Excisional Skin Tension Lines
Review of human hair optical properties in possible relation to melanoma development
Simulation of UV power absorbed by follicular stem cells during sun exposure and possible implications for melanoma development
Are Incisional and Excisional Skin Tension Lines Biomechanically Different? Understanding the Interplay between Elastin and Collagen during Surgical Procedures
Using a Thermal Imaging Camera to Locate Perforators on the Lower Limb

Philanthropy
In 2017, Paul created a mobile library classroom under his charitable foundation, the Baci Foundation, a free nonprofit initiative, which provides literacy and mentoring programmes to the disadvantaged children. He also funded literacy programmes in schools with his venture Baci Lounge which has served as a model of social entrepreneurship.

References

1966 births
Academic staff of the University of Queensland
University of Madras alumni
Alumni of the University of Glasgow
University of Queensland alumni
Living people
21st-century English businesspeople
21st-century English writers